Saranga Shrestha is a Nepali actor and performer. In the early 2000s, she was considered one of the leading artistes of Nepali film industry. She was a student of Sanskritik Sansthan. She is known for her dancing. Her film credits include Aago, Sindur Pote and Sarangi.

Personal life
She divorced her first husband, an American national, and married a non-resident Nepali, Ramesh Karki, in 2012. She lives with him in Baltimore where she teaches dancing. She has a daughter, born in Baltimore.

References

Year of birth missing (living people)
Living people
Nepalese film actresses
Actresses in Nepali cinema
21st-century Nepalese actresses
Nepalese emigrants to the United States